Royston Tycho Crandon (born 31 May 1983) is a West Indian international cricketer. He is a right-handed Batsman and off spin bowler who plays domestically for Guyana. In 2009 Crandon made his ODI debut for the West Indies. He is the brother of Esuan Crandon, who also plays for Guyana.

External links
CricketArchive profile
Cricinfo profile

1983 births
Living people
Guyanese cricketers
West Indies One Day International cricketers
Guyana cricketers